The Guatemalan ambassador to the Hoy See in Rome is the official representative of the Government in Guatemala City to the subject of international law, Holy See.

List of representatives

References 

 
Holy See
Guatemala